The Bushido Blade is a 1981 film directed by Tom Kotani. Sonny Chiba, Toshiro Mifune, Mako, Laura Gemser and James Earl Jones appear in this film. It was filmed in 1978, but not released until 1981. This was Richard Boone's last film appearance.

Plot 
The Bushido Blade is a fictional sideline to the true events surrounding the treaty Commodore Matthew Perry signed with the shogun of feudal Japan. The samurai sword entrusted to Commodore Perry for President Franklin Pierce of the United States by the Emperor of Japan is stolen by factions wishing to maintain Japanese isolationism. The sword is stolen by Baron Zen, who is a servant of Lord Yamato, who opposes the Convention of Kanagawa about to be signed.

Commodore Akira Hayashi is told to recover the sword and, as a matter of honor, not sign the treaty until it is recovered. Prince Ido has received Hayashi's order to regain the sword and goes to the castle of Yamato alone. Similarly, Perry has ordered Captain Lawrence Hawk to retrieve the sword. Hawk brings Midshipman Robin Gurr and Crew Bos'n Cave Johnson. The three get separated and the movie centers on their stories.

Cast 
Principal actors

 Richard Boone as Commodore Matthew C. Perry
 Sonny Chiba as Prince Ido (as Sony Chiba)
 Frank Converse as Captain Lawrence Hawk 
 Laura Gemser as Tomoe
 James Earl Jones as the prisoner (a crew member of the whaling ship)
 Mako Iwamatsu as Enjirō (as Mako)
 Timothy Murphy as Midshipman Robin Gurr
 Michael Starr as L/S Cave Johnson
 Tetsurō Tamba as Lord Yamato
 Toshirō Mifune as Commodore Akira Hayashi

Supporting roles
 Bin Amatsu as Baron Zen 
 Mayumi Asano as Yuki
 Kin Ōmae as Rikishi (sumo wrestler) (as Kin Omai)

Crew 
 Film director - Tom Kotani
 Executive producer - Jules Bass
 Associate producer - Benni Korzen, Masaki Îzuka
 Producer - Arthur Rankin, Jr.
 Writer - William Overgard
 Music - Maury Laws
 Cinematography - Shōji Ueda 
 Editing - Yoshitami Kuroiwa
 Post-production executive - Robert D. Cardona
 Editorial consultant - Anne V. Coates
 Production manager - Kishirô Ōkubo
 1st assistant direction - Kouichi Nakajima
 Lighting - Kazuo Shimomura
 Art director - Toyokazu Ôhashi
 Sound recording - Yūji Miyoshi
 Sound editor - Ian Crafford
 Sound re-recording - Paul Carr (composer)
 Dueling master - Ryu Kuze
 Production secretary - Barbara Hilse
 U.S.Navy coordination - Commodore William North, U.S.N.

See also 
 List of historical drama films of Asia

References

External links 
 

1981 films
1981 drama films
1980s historical films
American drama films
British drama films
1980s Japanese-language films
Films scored by Maury Laws
Films set in the 1850s
Films set in Japan
Samurai films
Rankin/Bass Productions films
Films directed by Tsugunobu Kotani
Japan in non-Japanese culture
1980s English-language films
1980s American films
1980s British films